This article summarizes the events, album releases, and album release dates in hip hop music for the year 2004.

Released albums

Highest-charting singles

Highest first-week sales

Highest critically reviewed albums (Metacritic)

See also
Previous article: 2003 in hip hop music
Next article: 2005 in hip hop music

References

2000s in hip hop music
Hip hop
Hip hop music by year